Elkhan Astanuly Astanov (born 21 May 2000) is a Kazakh footballer who plays as a winger for Astana and the Kazakhstan national team.

Career

Club
On 13 March 2023, Astana announced the signing of Astanov from Ordabasy.

International
Astanov made his international debut for Kazakhstan on 28 March 2021 in a 2022 FIFA World Cup qualification match against France, which finished as a 2–0 loss.

Career statistics

International

International goals

References

External links
 
 
 
 Elkhan Astanov at Vesti.kz

2000 births
Living people
People from Shymkent
Kazakhstani footballers
Kazakhstan under-21 international footballers
Kazakhstan international footballers
Association football wingers
FC Ordabasy players
Kazakhstan Premier League players